The Mayor of Ahmednagar is the first citizen of the Indian city of Ahmednagar. This person is the chief of the Ahmednagar Municipal Corporation, but his/her role is largely ceremonial as the real powers are vested in the Municipal Commissioner. The Mayor also plays a functional role in deliberating over the discussions in the Corporation. Mrs. Rohini Shendage (belonging to the Shivsena political party) is the current Mayor of Ahmednagar.

Current Mayor 

The current mayor is Mrs. Rohini Shendage of the Shivsena, won the mayoral election on 1 July 2021.

History of the Office 
Ahmednagar Municipal Council was converted and elevated to Municipal Corporation in 2003. The office came into existence since then.

Election of the mayor 
The mayor is elected from within the ranks of the council in a quinquennial election. The elections are conducted in all 68 wards in the city to elect corporators. The party that wins the maximum number of seats holds an internal voting to decide the mayor.

The tenure of the mayor is two and a half years.

Mayors of Ahmednagar

References

External links 
 Ahmednagar Municipal Website

Ahmednagar
Mayors of places in Maharashtra
People from Ahmednagar